Holly Martin is a YouTuber and solo sailor best known for sailing her 27-foot sloop Gecko as part of her YouTube channel Wind Hippie Sailing. Martin sails a Grinde 27 that she purchased in Connecticut and returned to Maine where she spent over a year preparing to make her seaworthy. Her goal of completing a circumnavigation started in October 2018 when she left Round Pond Maine and headed towards the Panama Canal. After spending time in the Caribbean for a year she transited the Panama Canal and entered the Pacific Ocean in May 2020, after a 41-day solo passage to French Polynesia Martin was unable to leave due to COVID-19 restrictions. While underway Martin is an avid reader, and at anchor she enjoys snorkeling, catching fish, and meeting the new people.

Martin grew up on boats with her parents, first on a Cal 25, as they sailed in the south pacific and later the Arctic where she spent time being schooled in Iceland, Norway, and Canada. She holds a degree in Marine Biology and worked aboard an Antarctic research vessel as a research support technician.

References 

YouTube vloggers
American sailors
New Zealand people
Single-handed circumnavigating sailors
1994 births
Living people